The Mann & Grimmer M.1 was a British prototype two-seat fighter aircraft of the First World War. It was a single-engined biplane with a radial engine in the aircraft's nose driving two pusher propellers, which was hoped to give a good field of fire for the gunner and high performance. Only one example was built, with no production following.

Design and development
In 1913, the schoolboy Reginald F. Mann, a successful designer and builder of model aircraft, set up the company "Mann & Grimmer" at Surbiton, London with his teacher Robert T. Grimmer to build model aircraft on a commercial scale. The outbreak of the First World War in August 1914 resulted in Mann starting the design of a two-seat machine gun-armed aircraft. Mann wanted his design to combine a good field of fire for the observer's machine gun, as found in pusher configuration aircraft, with the higher performance found in tractor aircraft. To meet these requirements, his design featured a deep conventional fuselage, powered by a single engine mounted in the nose, which drove two 2-bladed pusher propellers that were mounted behind and between the wings, via a long shaft to a gearbox and chain drives to the propellers. The observer sat in the nose of the aircraft, just behind the engine, while the pilot sat in a separate cockpit behind the trailing edge of the wings. It had two-bay wings with a swept leading edge and ailerons on upper and lower wings. It had a fixed conventional landing gear.

The prototype was assembled at Hendon Aerodrome in February 1915, fitted with a  Anzani radial engine. It made its maiden flight on 19 February 1915. In order to improve performance, it was fitted with a  Anzani, flying in this form on 29 June 1915. While it was planned that the aircraft would be evaluated by the Royal Flying Corps, this did not occur because the prototype was wrecked in a crash-landing during an attempt on the British altitude record on 16 November 1915, caused by failure of the gearbox.

Specifications (125 hp Anzani)

Notes

References

 Bruce, J. M. British Aeroplanes 1914–18. London: Putnam, 1957.
 Bruce, J. M. War Planes of the First World War: Volume One Fighters. London: Macdonald, 1965.
 Green, William and Gordon Swanborough. The Complete Book of Fighters. New York: Smithmark, 1994. .
 Grimmer, Robert P. "Designing and Building A Biplane: The Story of a Successful Experiment" Part One. Flight, 9 March 1916, pp. 205–206.
 Grimmer, Robert P. "Designing and Building A Biplane: The Story of a Successful Experiment" Part Two. Flight, 16 March 1916, pp. 224–226.
Gunston, Bill. World Encyclopedia of Aircraft Manufacturers. Stroud, UK: Sutton Publishing, Second edition, 2005. .
"The New "Mann" Biplane". Flight, 26 March 1915, p. 208.

1910s British fighter aircraft
Aircraft first flown in 1915